Violence: The Role-Playing Game of Egregious and Repulsive Bloodshed is a short, 32-page role-playing game written by Greg Costikyan under the pseudonym "Designer X" and was published by Hogshead Publishing in 1999 as part of its New Style line of games.

Gameplay
Violence is a satire of conventional dungeon-bashing games, set in a contemporary metropolis where the player characters dash from room to room killing the occupants and stealing their belongings. In a style reminiscent of Mad, it is relentlessly user-hostile, taking time out to insult the reader wherever possible (it opens with the words, "Welcome to Violence, you degraded turd") and uses a system where the user can buy experience points for cash from the designer or publisher. Despite the innovative game design and exhaustive lists of equipment and weapons (including both belt and orbital sanders), monster types and possible scenarios, it is largely and deliberately unplayable because of an exhaustive rule-set. The rule-set provides information on a range of things related to killing. Weapons, combat styles, and the like are intricately detailed, considering the short length of the volume. Violence is a rant against the traditional styles of Dungeons & Dragons, MMORPGs, and the Grand Theft Auto series, written to simultaneously annoy, enrage and challenge the reader. As a game, it is of little value, but is useful as an insight into the mindset of its author and an indictment of an endemic style of role-playing.

The cover art was by Clint Langley. A Spanish language edition exists.

History
Violence (1999), by Greg Costikyan (aka Designer X), was one of the New Style role-playing games published by Hogshead Publishing. According to Shannon Appelcline, Violence "was probably the least loved of the New Style games. Like Power Kill it was a largely social commentary. It used humor and satire to critique violence in role-playing games and was sufficiently biting that Wallis thought of it as a Modest Proposal for the role-playing Game industry. Set in the modern day, Violence lets players do dungeon crawls into places like the homes of illegal immigrants, kills them and takes their stuff. However, satire did not necessarily produce a playable role-playing game on its own."
 
In August 2005, Costikyan released Violence under a Creative Commons license, and made it available for download.

Violence was part of a series of experimental and alternative role-playing games published by Hogshead Publishing. Other games in the series include the award-nominated The Extraordinary Adventures of Baron Munchausen, Pantheon, and Puppetland/Powerkill.

References

External links 
 
 Load Up On Guns, Bring Your Friends, a game scenario for Violence by Jody Macgregor (Critical Miss, issue 10).
 Violence (PDF download, costik.com)

British role-playing games
Creative Commons-licensed games
Greg Costikyan games
Horror role-playing games
New Style
Role-playing games introduced in 1999
Satirical games